is a Japanese psychiatrist, known for his pioneer research on Dementia with Lewy bodies (DLB), which he first described.

Life
Kosaka was born in Ise, Mie, and completed his M.D. in 1965 from Kanazawa University. He was appointed as a professor of psychiatry at Yokohama City University School of Medicine in 1991, before becoming a director of Yokohama City University Medical Center in 1995. He has been a director of Medical Care Court Clinic in Yokohama since 2011.

He received the 2013 Asahi Prize for discovering Dementia with Lewy bodies.

Contribution
In 1976, Kosaka described the concept of Dementia with Lewy bodies for the first time. Two years later, he reported three autopsied cases of Dementia with Lewy bodies.

The term Dementia with Lewy bodies was proposed at the first international workshop held in 1995, and is now in common use.

References

Japanese psychiatrists
Japanese biologists
Japanese neuroscientists
Academic staff of Yokohama City University
1939 births
Living people
People from Ise, Mie
Lewy body dementia